"On the Inside" is the theme song for the Australian soap opera Prisoner (known as Prisoner: Cell Block H in some territories). It was written by Allan Caswell and performed by Lynne Hamilton.

Background and recording 
Caswell recalls that his "publisher was having lunch with a guy from Grundy's one Friday and asked what they had coming up. They already had music for Prisoner, but the final decision was being made on the Monday and if we could get something to them by then they'd listen to it. I didn't get a chance to work on it until the Sunday afternoon. It was like buying a lottery ticket – either I write something and it might get accepted or I don't write something and not give myself a chance." Caswell recorded the song on a portable cassette player "and gave it to his publisher who delivered it without listening to it. Within five days, I was in the studio with Lynne Hamilton. She got half way through the song and burst into tears. Anyone who believed in it like that was going to do a good version of it."

An alternative version of this song was used in the credits of the Season One finale, Episode 79, and again in Episode 151. On this version, there is a small guitar intro and the orchestration is slightly different. This particular version is not available on the soundtrack and was only used during the credits at the end of the show on rare occasions. The song alternated with an orchestra-only version of this track during the first two seasons.

Charts

Weekly charts
The song was a hit in Australia in 1979 when the television show was launched, and reached number three on the UK Singles Chart in 1989 when the show attracted millions of viewers in its late night slot in ITV regions.

Year-end charts

Track listings
Australian 7" single (RCA Victor – 103316)
Side A "On the Inside" – 3:11
Side B "Love Theme from "Prisoner""  performed by William Mottling Orchestra  – 2:23

Infringement 
In 2009, writer Allan Caswell alleged that Alabama's song "Christmas in Dixie" was 'ripped off' from "On the Inside", but conceded that legal action was unlikely as both he and Alabama were signed to Sony.

Cover versions 
The song was recorded as a slower country ballad by Patti Page; coincidently the series of Prisoner was enormously popular in the United States, where it was known as Prisoner: Cell Block H.

The song was rerecorded and released by singer Ella Hooper to coincide with Foxtel's Australian re-run of the series, which started in March 2011.

Reggae singer Donna Marie has also recorded a version, with minor alterations to some lines.

It was also covered by the Living End, titled "Prisoner on the Inside".

Use in Wentworth revival
Although the song was not used as the theme for Wentworth, the 2013 reimagining of Prisoner, it was briefly heard in the pilot episode, being hummed by Jacs Holt (played by Kris McQuade), the show's main antagonist. The original Lynn Hamilton single version of "On the Inside" was, however, used on the closing credits of the final episode of Wentworth (titled "Legacy") in Australia, which aired 26 October 2021, whilst a modern cover version was used on the UK broadcast on Five Star later the same day.

Releases
It was released in the United States on Hilltak 7903.

References

1979 songs
1979 singles
1989 singles
Television drama theme songs
Pop ballads
Songs written by Allan Caswell
RCA Victor singles
Hilltak Records singles
Dureco singles
Songs involved in plagiarism controversies